Sakiko Fukuda-Parr (サキコ・フクダ・パー、福田 咲子) (born 1950) is a development economist who has gained recognition for her work with the United Nations Development Programme (UNDP) and for her writing in publications including the Journal of Human Development and Capabilities, which she founded.

Since 1973, when Fukuda-Parr worked in the Young Professionals Programme at World Bank, she has played a large role on the world stage of globalization, poverty, and economics, with interests in technology, human rights, gender, capacity development, and aid architecture. Despite the tremendous imbalance of international resources and wealth distribution, Fukuda-Parr maintains hope for positive human development.

She is a joint winner of the 2019 Grawemeyer Award alongside Terra Lawson-Remer and Susan Randolph for Ideas for Improving World Order.

Education
Fukuda-Parr pursued her interests in culture, international affairs, and human development at the universities of Cambridge (receiving a bachelor's degree in the social and political sciences), Sussex (receiving a master’s in economics), and the Fletcher School of Law and Diplomacy (receiving a master’s in law and diplomacy (MALD)).

Career
After working as a loan officer with the World Bank from 1974 to 1979, Fukuda-Parr served as a technical adviser in agricultural economics at the United Nations Development Programme from 1979 to 1985.  Then, as Deputy Resident Adviser in Burundi (1985-1987), Principle Economist and Deputy Director at the Regional Bureau for Africa (1986-1991), and Chief of the West Africa Division (1992-1994), Fukuda-Parr garnered both the information and the experience to become Director of the Human Development Report Office (1995-2006).

From a loan officer at World Bank to a director at the UNDP, Fukuda-Parr has been positioned throughout the world (Burundi, Morocco, and Turkey, for instance). Particularly as a director, she gained insight into the process of human development, with an emphasis on “democracy, cultural diversity, and human rights.” To promote awareness of the vast inequalities separating gender, race, and class, Fukuda-Parr aided in the publication of research-based proposals and policy work on technical cooperation effectiveness and capacity building.

Since leaving the UNDP, Fukuda-Parr has worked as a professor at the School of International and Public Affairs at Columbia University, Kennedy School of Government at Harvard University, and The Graduate Program in International Affairs at The New School.

In November 2016, Fukuda-Parr was appointed by United Nations Secretary-General Ban Ki-moon to the High-Level Panel on Access to Medicines, co-chaired by Ruth Dreifuss, former President of Switzerland, and Festus Mogae, former President of Botswana. She also serves on the advisory board for Academics Stand Against Poverty (ASAP) and on the University of Oslo/The Lancet Independent Panel on Global Governance for Health.

Writer and editor
To supplement her teaching and professional experience, Fukuda-Parr has acted as both writer and editor on works pertaining to human development, poverty, and economics.  In addition to her contributions to the Annual Human Development Reports, she has written and edited several works, including Rethinking Technical Cooperation: Reforms for Capacity Building in Africa, Capacity for Development: New Solutions to Old Problems and The Gene Revolution: GM Crops and Unequal Development. She also has participated in several journal projects and written book chapters concerning capacity development and human rights.  As an editor, she founded the Journal of Human Development (2000, annually), co-edited Readings in Human Development: Concepts, Measures and Policies for a Development Paradigm, and has held a position on the Feminist Economics editorial board.

In her writings, such as those for the Belfer Center, she highlights a lack of social parity on an international scale.  Inequalities, according to Fukuda-Parr, exist in education, resource distribution, gender rights, and income.  Despite such inequalities, however, Fukuda-Parr remains positive about social and economic change.  Her role in the Millennium Development Goals, among other initiatives, is making a difference in the wars on poverty and inequality.  Toward this end, she will continue to fight for an outcome that embodies true human rights on every level.

In The Adventure of Peace, Fukuda-Parr’s chapter, "Poverty and Inequality – Challenges in the Era of Globalisation," describes the central challenge intrinsically dividing society: the direction of globalization.  As a synopsis of her works and her beliefs, Fukuda-Parr urges nations to redirect globalization so that it benefits all countries and all peoples, to promote democratization as a force for greater social justice and to address poverty as part of the agenda for collective security.  Critical issues (such as HIV/AIDS, migration, links between development and conflict, cultural diversity, and global governance) can be more appropriately tackled with global solidarity and an “inclusive form” of globalization.

Personal life
Fukuda-Parr was born in Tokyo, Japan.  She gained a global perspective by moving from Tokyo to London to Washington, D.C. and, finally, to Manila because of her father’s position with the Japanese Treasury. She is married to Francis Parr and is the mother of two children, Nicholas and Henry. She currently resides in the upper west side of Manhattan.

Selected bibliography

Books

Chapters in books

Journals

Human Development Reports 
 Human Development Reports 1995-2004 – lead author, with Sir Richard Jolly (1996–99); lead author (2000-04) 
 Human Development Report 2004: Cultural Liberty in Today’s Diverse World. 
 Human Development Report 2003: The Millennium Development Goals, a Compact among Nations to end Human Poverty. 
 Human Development Report 2002: Deepening Democracy in a Fragmented World. 
 Human Development Report 2001: Making New Technologies Work for Human Development. 
 Human Development Report 2000: Human Rights and Human Development. 
 Human Development Report 1999: Globalization with a Human Face. 
 Human Development Report 1998: Consumption and Human Development. 
 Human Development Report 1997: Human Development to Eradicate Poverty. 
 Human Development Report 1996: Human Development and Economic Growth.

See also 
 International Association for Feminist Economics
 Feminist economics
 Feminist Economics - journal
 List of feminist economists

References

External links 
 Official website
 2007.  “Sakiko Fukuda-Parr.” Harvard (accessed 8 June 2014).
 2006.  “Sakiko Fukuda-Parr.” New School (accessed 8 June 2014).
 

1950 births
Living people
Alumni of the University of Sussex
Non-fiction environmental writers
Japanese economists
Japanese women economists
Feminist economists
The New School faculty
Japanese expatriates in the United States